The second USS Guerriere was a sloop-of-war in the United States Navy. She was named for the victory of the frigate  over  during the War of 1812.

Guerriere was launched on 9 September 1865 in the Boston Navy Yard and commissioned on 21 May 1867, Commander Thomas G. Corbin, in command. She sailed from New York on 28 June 1867 to serve as flagship of the South Atlantic Squadron protecting American commerce and interests along the coast of South America.

Guerriere recommissioned at New York on 10 August 1870. At Portsmouth, New Hampshire, 27 September, she received the body of the late Admiral David Farragut for transport to New York. The following day she went fast aground on Great Point, Nantucket and transferred Admiral Farragut's remains to merchant steamer SS Island Home. She got afloat on 1 October and continued to New York the following day.

Guerriere departed New York on 17 December 1870 for Lisbon, thence past Gibraltar for cruising with the Mediterranean Squadron. On 7 April 1871 she was host to the pasha of Tripoli, who inspected the ship and presented Guerrieres captain with the anchor of the frigate . This anchor had laid on the beach for more than half a century after the destruction of the frigate in Tripoli Harbor by Captain Stephen Decatur in "the most bold and daring act of the age". From Tripoli the sloop cruised to the ports of Egypt, Lebanon, Italy and France. On 1 December 1871 she stood out of Villefranche with the remains of Major General Anderson, which were transferred to Army authorities off Fort Monroe, Virginia, 6 February 1872. She remained at Norfolk, Virginia until 10 March, then sailed for the New York Navy Yard where she decommissioned on 22 March 1872. She was laid up in ordinary there until 12 December 1872 when she was sold to D. Buchler of New York.

See also
List of sloops of war of the United States Navy

References

Sloops of the United States Navy
1865 ships